The 1959 Japan Series was the Nippon Professional Baseball (NPB) championship series for the 1959 season. It was the tenth Japan Series and featured the Pacific League champions, the Nankai Hawks, against the Central League champions, the Yomiuri Giants.

Summary

Matchups

Game 1
Saturday, October 24, 1959 – 1:00 pm at Osaka Stadium in Osaka, Osaka Prefecture

Game 2
Sunday, October 25, 1959 – 1:00 pm at Osaka Stadium in Osaka, Osaka Prefecture

Game 3
Tuesday, October 27, 1959 – 1:00 pm at Korakuen Stadium in Bunkyō, Tokyo

Game 4
Thursday, October 29, 1959 – 1:00 pm at Korakuen Stadium in Bunkyō, Tokyo

See also
1959 World Series

References

Japan Series
Japan Series
Japan Series
Japan Series